The Alabama Rural Heritage Center is a regional heritage organization located in Thomaston, Alabama that was established in 1986, but closed permanently as of January, 2022.   It was established by the Alabama Department of Economic and Community Affairs and local volunteers.  The center, now defunct,   was
headquartered in the old home economics building on the former Marengo County High School campus, which was repurposed by Auburn University's Rural Studio.  The center is run by the non-profit Alabama Rural Heritage Foundation, but is no longer operational.

Before closing doors, The Rural Heritage Center housed a combination folk art gallery, theater, restaurant, community meeting place, and a commercial production kitchen.  The center produces local food products under the "Mama Nem's" trademark.  The recipes for their products were developed with the Auburn University College of Human Sciences through a U.S. Department of Housing and Urban Development grant.

References

External links
Alabama Rural Heritage Foundation
Building the Alabama Rural Heritage Center

Non-profit organizations based in Alabama
Auburn University
Art museums and galleries in Alabama
Buildings and structures in Marengo County, Alabama
Tourist attractions in Marengo County, Alabama